Khargush Khani (also Romanized as Khargūsh Khānī and Khargūsh Khūnī) is a village in Heshmatabad Rural District, in the Central District of Dorud County, Lorestan Province, Iran. At the 2006 census, its population was 44, in 11 families.

References 

Towns and villages in Dorud County